The famine in Sudan in 1998 was a humanitarian disaster caused mainly by human rights abuses, as well as drought and the failure of the international community to react to the famine risk with adequate speed. The worst affected area was Bahr el Ghazal in southwestern Sudan.  In this region over 70,000 people died during the famine.

Causes 
The famine was caused almost entirely by human rights abuse and the war in Southern Sudan. Despite the Sudanese government's claims that only the rebel groups were to blame, drought also played a significant role. Human Rights Watch blamed the following groups:

 The government of Sudan
 The Baggara militia
 Sudan People's Liberation Army
 Dinka warlord Kerubino Kuanyin Bol

The government and Kuanyin Bol are blamed for their role in destroying the local agriculture during their attempt to take the city of Wau. The SPLA are blamed for their maintenance of slavery and pilfering of aid.

This was worsened by the late arrival of the rainy season and a failure to respond to the situation by the international community.

Effects 

The effects on the region were enormous, with the excess mortality estimated at about 70,000 people. Many more are thought to have been displaced, with over 72,000 people reported as migrating from the threatened rural zones to Wau alone from May 1998 to August 1998.
Effects on the country included – indirectly – famine as expenditure was concentrated on the materials of war, i.e. weaponry, medical supplies etc., rather than the assistance of agriculture and farming. The situation in Bahr El Ghazal was compounded by a lack of strong government intervention, with the government in the North failing to cooperate with the  government in the South.

Aftermath 
A ceasefire was signed on July 15, 1998, some eight months after the Sudanese government had first warned of a possible famine. After numerous extensions, this ceasefire lasted nearly a year, until April 1999. However, the Baggara militia continued to ignore the ceasefire, reducing the ability of aid agencies to help.  Thanks to a good crop and this ceasefire, however, the situation was brought under control by the end of 1998.  However, the area has remained in trouble and a number of famine warnings have come since the end of 1998.

See also 
 Second Sudanese Civil War
 Darfur conflict
 2017 South Sudan famine
 1993 Sudan famine

Notes and references

External links 
 Human Rights Watch Report on the Famine
 Report of the Pulitzer-winning photographer's death who shot the NY Times cover about the Sudan Famine- baby toddler crawling for food with the vulture waiting around for him/her to die to eat it

Sudan 1998
Famine 1998
Famine
Famine 1998
Sudan Famine
20th-century famines